Gerald "Jerry" Mercer (born April 27, 1939) is a Canadian drummer, best known for his work with the rock groups Mashmakhan and April Wine.

Personal life 
Mercer was born in Newfoundland. Prior to becoming a full-time musician, Mercer worked both as a cattle farmer and as an IBM computer programmer.

Career 
Mercer's start in the music industry was as a singer, but quickly moved to drums while still a teenager.  He played several different styles in his early years, including Latin and jazz, Jerry Mercer was the drummer for Trevor Payne and The Soul Brothers in the early 60s in Montreal. With the  departure of Trevor Payne the group became known as The Triangle, who later changed their name to Mashmakhan upon obtaining a record deal in Toronto.  Mercer's work can be heard on the band's most successful single "As the Years Go By".  As part of Mashmakhan, Mercer played on the Festival Express tour and was interviewed for the 2003 documentary.

Following Mashmakhan's dissolution in the early 1970s, Mercer played for Roy Buchanan, and then The Wackers, before joining April Wine, who were in the process of changing their line-up following the departure of two founding members in 1973.  His first public performance with the band was as an opening slot for T. Rex and Three Dog Night at Toronto's Exhibition Stadium.  Shortly thereafter, he completed his first album with the band, Electric Jewels, which contained the hit "Weeping Widow".  Mercer remained with the band consistently since joining, and played on all their subsequent albums and tours.  In November 2008, he stated that he was retiring at the end of the year. He was replaced by Blair Mackay in January 2009. In May 2010, Mercer became the first Canadian to receive a Legends Award at the 10th annual Cape Breton International Drum Festival.

In his live shows, Mercer was known for lengthy drum solos (often during April Wine's cover of King Crimson's "21st Century Schizoid Man") which frequently include a strobe light show.

In addition to performing, Mercer was also involved in manufacturing drums with a company he co-founded with Bill Hibbs called Monolith Drums.  Briefly assuming the brand name "Solstice Drums", now back to Monolith and about to celebrate 20 years of drum making.  Mercer is no longer involved with Monolith Drums.

Health 
In 1997, Mercer was diagnosed with prostate cancer, but finished treatment for it the following year.

See also 
 April Wine
 Mashmakhan

References

External links 
 Official website
 
 
 

April Wine members
Mashmakhan members
The Wackers members
Canadian rock drummers
Canadian male drummers
Living people
People from Newfoundland (island)
1939 births
20th-century Canadian drummers